Baltico S. "Bo" Erias (July 30, 1932 – January 25, 2007) was an American professional basketball player. Erias was selected in the 1954 NBA Draft by the Rochester Royals after a collegiate career at Niagara. He played for the Minneapolis Lakers in 1958 and averaged 8.2 points, 4.6 rebounds and 1.4 assists per contest in 18 career games.

References

1932 births
2007 deaths
Basketball players from New York City
Minneapolis Lakers players
Niagara Purple Eagles men's basketball players
People from Astoria, Queens
Sportspeople from Niagara Falls, New York
Rochester Royals draft picks
Small forwards
Sportspeople from Brooklyn
American men's basketball players